is a Japanese anime film trilogy, which adapts Kentaro Miura's Berserk manga series, specifically its Golden Age arc, and was produced by Studio 4°C. The first two films, The Egg of the King and The Battle for Doldrey, were released in Japan in February and June 2012, and the third film, The Advent, was released in February 2013. In North America, Viz Media has licensed the trilogy for English home video release. A remastered edited version for television with new scenes, labeled as "Memorial Edition", was broadcast for 13 episodes from October to December 2022.

Plot summary

The Egg of the King
A soldier named Guts attracts the attention of a mercenary group, The Band of the Hawk, when he kills an enemy champion during a siege. He is forced into joining the group after being defeated in single combat by its leader, Griffith. The Band of the Hawk are employed by the Kingdom of Midland for its Hundred Year War against the Tudor Empire, and Griffith rises in the kingdom's hierarchy after a successful battle. During another siege, Guts and Griffith encounter the demon Nosferatu Zodd, who notices the pendant around Griffith's neck and warns Guts that Griffith will be his doom. Griffith's rise in status is ill-received by Midland's noblemen, and there is a failed assassination attempt on Griffith by the king's brother, Julius. Griffith charges Guts with murdering Julius, and Guts also kills the noble's young son. Guts, emotionally scarred by his actions, overhears Griffith say that The Band of the Hawk are his comrades, but for people to be friends they must purse their own dreams and not someone else's.

The Battle for Doldrey
Guts and Casca are separated from The Band of the Hawk, and fend off attacks by the Tudor's cruel commander Adon and his men. Guts defeats most of Adon's men while covering Casca's escape, but begins to lament his life's path and decides he will eventually leave the Band of the Hawk, find and pursue his own dream, and become a true friend to Griffith. Later, the Band of the Hawk participates in the battle to capture the impenetrable Fortress of Doldrey and end the Hundred Years War, wherein Casca kills Adon. A month after the war's end, Guts parts ways with Griffith after defeating him in a duel. Griffith is distraught at Guts' departure, and in a lapse of judgment he is caught sleeping with the king's daughter, Charlotte. Griffith is charged with treason and imprisoned in the Tower of Rebirth while the members of the Band of the Hawk are branded outlaws.

The Advent
A year after Guts' departure from the Band of the Hawk, he returns to aid them in freeing Griffith from the Tower of Rebirth. However, when they find Griffith he is barely alive, rendered mute, and physically withered after months of torture. Griffith attempts suicide, and his pendant reacts to his despair, opening a portal to another dimension experiencing a solar eclipse that draws in him and The Band of the Hawk. There, they encounter archdemons known as The God Hand and Griffith is told that his tribulations have been leading to this moment, when Griffith agrees to sacrifice his allies in exchange for being reborn as Femto, a member of the God Hand. The Band of the Hawk are slaughtered by the God Hand's monstrous Apostles (former humans like Nosferatu Zodd) and Femto rapes Casca. Guts loses his left arm and right eye trying to save Casca, but Casca loses her sanity from the nightmarish ordeal. Guts and Casca are spirited back to their world by the mysterious Skull Knight, who tells Guts he has been branded by the God Hand and will be subjected to nightly attacks by evil creatures. Guts leaves Casca under the care of former comrade Rickert and embarks on a journey to hunt down Apostles and the God Hand.

Voice cast
The Japanese voice cast features Hiroaki Iwanaga as Guts (replacing Nobutoshi Canna from the original anime), Takahiro Sakurai as Griffith (replacing Toshiyuki Morikawa), and Toa Yukinari as Casca (replacing Yūko Miyamura). The English voice cast features Marc Diraison as Guts, Kevin T. Collins as Griffith, and Carrie Keranen as Casca, all reprising their roles from the original anime.

Release
The project was first announced as a new anime project in September 2010 on a wraparound jacket band on volume 35 of the Berserk manga.  was released on February 4, 2012, in Japan.

 was released on June 23, 2012, in Japan.

 was released on February 1, 2013, in Japan.

In North America, Viz Media has licensed all three films for a home video release. The Egg of the King was released on November 27, 2012; The Battle for Doldrey was released on August 6, 2013; and The Advent was released on April 15, 2014. The Golden Age Arc has also been available for streaming on Netflix.

In June 2022, it was announced that the trilogy would receive a television broadcast version, titled . The series was featured at the Aniplex Online Fest 2022, held on September 23, 2022. It was directed by Yuta Sano and broadcast for 13 episodes on Tokyo MX, Tochigi TV, Gunma TV, BS11 and other networks from October 2 to December 25, 2022. It was streamed outside of Asia by Crunchyroll.

Music
The soundtracks for the film series are composed and arranged by Shirō Sagisu, with the theme song composed and arranged by Susumu Hirasawa. The insert song of all films, "Aria", is performed by Hirasawa, a live performance (from Phonon 2555 Vision) is included on the home video releases of the second film, another live version is on the Nomonos and Imium DVD; the ending theme of the first film, is performed by Japanese-American singer-songwriter Ai (in an uncharacteristic epic ballad style) and composed by Rykeyz and Redd Styiez; lastly, the ending theme of the third film, "Breakthrough", is performed by Kaname Kawabata of CHEMISTRY, written by Kawabata, Hidenori Tanaka and UTA, and arranged by Sagisu, Miho Hazama and CHOKKAKU. A special TV program, narrated by Akio Ōtsuka (the voice actor for the Skull Knight), that summarized the events of the first two movies, used the Hirasawa song  (from The Secret of the Flowers of Phenomenon) as its ending theme.

The television broadcast version of the trilogy, Berserk: The Golden Age Arc – Memorial Edition, features an exclusive ending theme by Mika Nakashima, titled "Wish". It also features new music composed by Sagisu and Hirasawa.

Reception
In Japan, Berserk: The Golden Age Arc I: The Egg of the King brought in $594,707 with a gross of $1,348,352, and the last film in the trilogy brought in less, with an opening weekend of $280,248 and grossing $399,445.

Kotaku'''s Richard Eisenbeis panned the first two installments of the trilogy, but described the third installment, Berserk: Golden Age Arc III: Descent'', as supreme and delivering an experience surpassing the original manga both in emotional turmoil and brutal violence.

Notes

References

External links
  
 
  
  
 
 
 
 
 
 
 

Berserk (manga)
2012 fantasy films
2012 horror films
2013 fantasy films
2013 horror films
Animated films based on manga
Anime films composed by Shirō Sagisu
Aniplex
Computer-animated films
Crunchyroll anime
Dark fantasy anime and manga
Films about rape
Films with screenplays by Ichirō Ōkouchi
High fantasy anime and manga
Japanese dark fantasy films
Japanese film series
Japanese horror films
Studio 4°C
Viz Media anime
Warner Bros. films